Anad is a village in Thiruvananthapuram district in the state of Kerala, India.

Anad is a Zoroastrian name (Persian: zartosht) meaning elements of God. and it is also use in the Hindi language where they adopted same meaning.

References

Villages in Thiruvananthapuram district